Tešanj Fortress (Bosnian, Croatian and Serbian: Tešanjska tvrđava / Тешањска тврђава), also known locally as Gradina is a fortress located in Tešanj, Bosnia and Herzegovina.

Location 
The fortress is located on a steep cliff around which Tešanj city centre eventually was formed. It is accessible only from one side which had provided it with a good defensive advantage against any incoming forces.

History 
No current historical sources identify the exact year of its construction or who its constructor was. The early foundation of this fortification had started some time during the Bronze Age and it was later gradually expanded by the Romans, Slavs and Ottomans. It has been primarily a defensive fortification and during the Ottoman period, the fortress had a permanent Ottoman Army garrison. In 1697, during Prince Eugene of Savoy's raid, it had been besieged for 3 days but remained unconquered.

See also
Tešanj

References

Castles in Bosnia and Herzegovina
National Monuments of Bosnia and Herzegovina
Tešanj
Medieval Bosnia and Herzegovina architecture